Frankenia salina, often called alkali heath or alkali seaheath, is a perennial herb native to California, Nevada, Mexico and Chile. It is uncommon even in the region where it is most likely to be found, just north of the San Francisco Bay Area.

It is a squat flowering bush that forms a twiggy thicket near beaches and coastal salt marshes. Its common name refers to its preference for alkaline soils as a halophyte. It has the ability to excrete salt as an adaptation for living in saline habitats. The flowers are pink or fuchsia in color.

References

External links
Calflora.org info page
Jepson Manual Treatment
California Native Plants: Propagation Info

salina
Halophytes
Flora of California
Salt marsh plants
Flora without expected TNC conservation status